Agbor is the most populous city among the Ika people. It is located in Ika South Local Government Area of Delta State, in South-south geo-political zone of Nigeria, West Africa. Agbor is the headquarters of Ika South Local Government Area, in Delta State, Nigeria.

Renovations on the College of Education in 2021 has led to Agbor being classified as a college town.

Agbor is home to some attractions and experiences.

Notable Ika people

 Jim Ovia - Nigeria Business Man
 Sunday Oliseh - Nigerian football manager
 Ifeanyi Okowa - Nigerian Politician
 Hanks Anuku - Nigerian actor
 Prince Fredoo Perry - Nigeria Youngest Promoter
 Sam Obi - Former Acting Governor of Delta State and Former Speaker, Delta State House of Assembly.
 Godwin Emefiele - Governor of the Central Bank of Nigeria

Towns

 Ogbemudein
 Ogbease
 Ihogbe
 Obiolihe
 Ihaikpen
 Ogbeisere
 Ogbeisogban
 Agbamuse/Oruru
 Alifekede
 Omumu
 Alisor
 Alileha
 Oza-nogogo 
 Agbobi
 Alisimie
 Ewuru
 Idumu-Oza
 Aliokpu
 Aliagwai
 Alihame
 Agbor-nta
 Alihagwu
 Oki
 Ekuku-Agbor
 Emuhun
 Boji-Boji Agbor

The Aladja-Itakpe-Ajaokuta rail crosses through the city of Agbor to the terminal at Owa to two steel hubs of Nigeria (Aladja and Ajaokuta)

Education 
Agbor is home to several educational institutions. Some of them include University of Delta, Agbor (formerly College of Education, Agbor); State School of Nursing and Midwifery, Agbor; Agbor Technical College, Agbor; and the proposed Anioma Open University, Agbor.

References

Cities in Delta State